Doom, Gloom, Heartache & Whiskey is the third studio album by English hard rock band Viking Skull. Recorded at producer Richard Gavalis's Dome Sound Studios in Royersford, Pennsylvania and drummer Jess Margera's Westtown Lake Studios in West Chester, Pennsylvania, it was released on 27 October 2008 by Powerage and Candlelight Records.

Background
In May 2008, Viking Skull announced that they would be writing and recording the follow-up to 2007's Chapter Two, to be entitled Doom, Gloom, Heartache & Whiskey, in the US in the summer, with CKY guitarist Chad I Ginsburg in line to produce the album. Recording took place between 16 and 28 July at two studios in Pennsylvania: Dome Sound Studios in Royersford (the studio of producer Richard Gavalis) and Westtown Lake Studios in West Chester (the studio of drummer Jess Margera).

Doom, Gloom, Heartache & Whiskey was released in October in the UK and November in the US as the first album on Powerage Records, a new label co-founded by Classic Rock magazine, in conjunction with Candlelight Records in the US.

Promotion
In promotion of Doom, Gloom, Heartache & Whiskey, Viking Skull completed a UK tour in December 2008 comprising 13 shows in 13 days. The band also supported Clutch on five shows in the US over the last five days of the year. For the tours, newly recruited guitarist Rich Vose was replaced by the returning Darren Smith, due to Vose "being missing and not being able to be contacted".

Reception

Media response to Doom, Gloom, Heartache & Whiskey was mixed to positive. Ned Raggett of AllMusic claimed that the album showcases "riffs that collapse skulls and hooks that roar with swagger", praising in particular the songs "Start a War", "Hair of the Dog" and "In for the Kill". Similarly, Blabbermouth.net's Scott Alisoglu described that the album features "boogie slams and hot-ass riffs with big, burly vocals", concluding that the style of music displayed on the release "never gets old". Rock Sound reviewer Darren Sadler praised the group for performing with "conviction and precision" on the album, which he claimed was "darker [and] more serious" than their previous releases.

Exclaim! writer Keith Carman, on the other hand, provided an unfavorable review of Doom, Gloom, Heartache & Whiskey. Describing the album's musical style as "groove metal-meets-Southern boogie", he condemned it as "a sick culmination of too many stoned nights listening to Black Sabbath, dreaming of being Dukes of Nothing and partying to ANTiSEEN".

Track listing

Personnel

Roddy Stone – vocals, guitar
Dom Wallace – guitar
Rich Vose – guitar
Kevin "Waldie" James – bass
Jess Margera – drums
Richard Gavalis – production, engineering, mixing, mastering
Dave K – artwork, layout
Rich Jones – artwork, layout

References

External links

Viking Skull albums
2008 albums